The 1988–89 DDR-Oberliga was the 40th season of the DDR-Oberliga, the first tier of league football in East Germany.

The league was contested by fourteen teams. Dynamo Dresden won the championship, the club's seventh out of eight East German championships.

Torsten Gütschow of Dynamo Dresden was the league's top scorer with 17 goals, while Andreas Trautmann of Dynamo Dresden took out the seasons East German Footballer of the year award.

On the strength of the 1988–89 title Dynamo Dresden qualified for the 1989–90 European Cup where the club was knocked out by AEK Athens in the first round. Second-placed club BFC Dynamo qualified for the 1989–90 European Cup Winners' Cup as the seasons FDGB-Pokal winners and was knocked out by AS Monaco in the second round. Third-placed FC Karl-Marx-Stadt qualified for the 1989–90 UEFA Cup where it was knocked out by Juventus in the third round while fourth-placed F.C. Hansa Rostock lost to FC Baník Ostrava in the first round.

Table									
The 1988–89 season saw two newly promoted clubs, BSG Energie Cottbus and BSG Sachsenring Zwickau.

Results

References

Sources

External links
 Das Deutsche Fussball Archiv  Historic German league tables

Ober
1988-89
1